Dizmar-e Markazi Rural District is in Kharvana District of Varzaqan County, East Azerbaijan province, Iran. At the National Census of 2006, its population was 2,632 in 633 households. There were 2,417 inhabitants in 651 households at the following census of 2011. At the most recent census of 2016, the population of the rural district was 4,091 in 1,274 households. The largest of its 19 villages was Lilab, with 764 people.

References 

Varzaqan County

Rural Districts of East Azerbaijan Province

Populated places in East Azerbaijan Province

Populated places in Varzaqan County